L Word Mississippi: Hate the Sin is an 2014 American television documentary film directed by Lauren Lazin. Produced by Ilene Chaiken as part of The L Word franchise, it premiered on Showtime on August 8, 2014. The film follows the lives of various lesbians living in the Bible Belt of the United States.

Filming lasted six to eight months in rural Mississippi. Lazin described the film as "much more about the hardships gay women face because of the religion they are brought up with."

L Word Mississippi: Hate the Sin received positive reviews, with critics praising its "heartbreaking" depiction of the real-life homophobia faced by gay women in rural parts of the Southern United States.  It won the GLAAD Media Award for Outstanding Documentary in 2015.

References

The L Word
2014 films
2014 television films
2014 documentary films
2014 LGBT-related films
American LGBT-related films
American documentary television films
Documentary films about lesbians
Documentary films about Mississippi
Lesbian-related films
LGBT culture in Mississippi
History of women in Mississippi
2010s American films